Lemar (Pashto:لمر, meaning "sun" in Pashto) is a television station based in Kabul, Afghanistan, which was founded in 2006. It is owned by MOBY Group. The channel broadcasts news, shows, and entertainment programs in the Pashto language. Its sister channels are TOLO TV and TOLOnews.

Lemar TV is one of the most popular Pashto channels and the 4th most popular channel in Afghanistan. The channel launched on August 15, 2006 and has made a place in the minds and hearts of its viewers in a record time. All content is produced locally or acquired globally and transmitted in Pashto. It is a mix of entertainment, news and current affairs are widely respected for their apolitical tenor and resonance with Pashto-speaking audiences.

Programs
Lemar TV play Hindi serials dubbed in Pashto such as Laagi Tujhse Lagan. This channel is the second-most watched Pashto channel in Afghanistan, after Shamshad TV which is the main transmission carrier Pashto channel along with Khyber TV.

Food Path 
Food Path is a famous food show in Afghanistan which aired every Friday on Lemar TV. The show had two hosts, Kiran Khan from Pakistan and Najeeba Faiz from Afghanistan.

Lemar Makham 
Is a social and entrainment program airing on Lemar TV.

Tawdi Khabari 
Is a current affairs program airing on Tolonews and Lemar TV.

Kaglechoona 
Kaglechoona is a current affairs program hosted by Mujeeb Muneeb and produced by Merwais Hamidi. Kaglechoona aired every Tuesday on Lemar TV and every Saturdays on TOLOnews.

Cricket
Cricket is quickly becoming popular in Afghanistan. The 2010 ICC World Twenty20 was shown for the first time in Afghanistan in the local languages of Pashto and Persian.This would also open its doors for showing other Cricket tournaments like Cricket World Cup, ICC Champions Trophy, Indian Premier League, Pakistan Super League, Bangladesh Premier League etc. in the future.

See also
 Television in Afghanistan

References

External links 
 Official site
 Lemar tv biss key
 Lemar TV Frequency
 Lemar TV  Live Streaming

Television stations in Afghanistan
Pashto mass media
Pashto-language television stations
Television channels and stations established in 2006
Mass media in Kabul